Samo napred... (trans. Ride On...) is the fifth studio album from Serbian and former Yugoslav rock band YU Grupa. It would be the last album recorded by YU Grupa before they disbanded in 1981, releasing their comeback album Od zlata jabuka in 1987.

Samo napred... is the band's first album recorded with the drummer Dragoljub Đuričić (who replaced Dragan Micić), the organist Dragan Janković and the guitarist Bata Kostić (who, although previously a member of the band, never appeared on any album recorded by the band, except on Među zvezdama as a guest).

Track listing

Personnel
Dragi Jelić - guitar, vocals
Žika Jelić - bass guitar
Bata Kostić - guitar, vocals (on "Plejboj")
Dragan Janković - organ
Dragoljub Đuričić - drums

Guest musicians
Marina Tucaković - lyrics
Slađana Milošević - backing vocals
Dragana Šarić - backing vocals
Aleksandar Pilipenko - producer
Dragan Vukićević - recorded by

References 
Samo napred... at Discogs
 EX YU ROCK enciklopedija 1960-2006,  Janjatović Petar;

External links 
Samo napred... at Discogs

YU Grupa albums
1979 albums
PGP-RTB albums